Lotlhakane is a large village located in the Southern District of Botswana. It had 4,828 inhabitants at the 2011 census.

See also
 List of cities in Botswana

References

Populated places in Botswana